Roy Greenwood (born 26 September 1952) is an English former professional footballer who played as a winger in the Football League for Hull City, Sunderland, Derby County, Swindon Town, Huddersfield Town and Tranmere Rovers in the 1970s and 1980s.

References

External links
 League stats at Neil Brown's site

1952 births
Living people
Footballers from Leeds
English footballers
Association football wingers
Hull City A.F.C. players
Sunderland A.F.C. players
Derby County F.C. players
Swindon Town F.C. players
Huddersfield Town A.F.C. players
Tranmere Rovers F.C. players
Scarborough F.C. players
English Football League players